NIP Nova Makedonija was a publishing and media company located in SFRY, and later in Macedonia, present-day North Macedonia. It was established in 1944 and ceased to exist in 2012.

References

1944 establishments in Yugoslavia
Publishing companies established in 1944
Publishing companies of North Macedonia
2012 disestablishments in the Republic of Macedonia
Publishing companies disestablished in 2012
Companies based in Skopje